Ajnabia (meaning "stranger" or "foreigner") is a genus of lambeosaurine hadrosaur from the Late Cretaceous (Maastrichtian) of Morocco. It is the first definitive hadrosaur from Africa, and is thought to be related to European dinosaurs like Arenysaurus. The discovery of Ajnabia came as a surprise to the paleontologists who found it, because Africa was isolated by water from the rest of the world during the Cretaceous, such that hadrosaurs were assumed to have been unable to reach the continent. The animal is relatively small; assuming it represents an adult it would be one of the smallest if not the smallest known hadrosaurids.

Discovery and naming
Ajnabia was recovered from the Late Maastrichtian strata of the phosphate mines at Sidi Chennane, in Khouribga Province, Morocco. Recovered elements include most of the left maxilla and part of the right, and a fragment of the right dentary. The name Ajnabia derives from the Arabic ajnabi, meaning "stranger" or "foreigner", referring to the animal as part of a dinosaur lineage that immigrated to Africa from elsewhere. The type and only species is A. odysseus, referring to the Greek hero and legendary sea voyager Odysseus.

Palaeoecology

The holotype specimen, MHNM KHG 222, was recovered from the phosphates of the Ouled Abdoun Basin of north-central Morocco. The phosphates are a nearshore marine environment, dominated by sharks, fish, mosasaurs and other marine reptiles. Rare dinosaurs are present here, however, including the large abelisaurid Chenanisaurus barbaricus and an unnamed titanosaurian. These dinosaurs would have lived in the very latest Cretaceous (Late Maastrichtian) approximately 1 million years before the K-Pg boundary  and the Chicxulub asteroid impact that wiped out the dinosaurs. They therefore provide insights into the diversity of Africa just before the dinosaurs became extinct.

Palaeobiogeography
Phylogenetic analysis suggests that Ajnabia is a member of the Lambeosaurinae, and specifically a member of the Arenysaurini, a clade otherwise known only from Europe. Based on the relationships of Ajnabia to other dinosaurs, and reconstructions of Late Cretaceous continents and seas, it was proposed that dispersal of Lambeosaurinae into North Africa most likely occurred via oceanic dispersal, with hadrosaurs swimming or drifting between Europe and North Africa.

External links
 Ajnabia odysseus- the first duckbill dinosaur from Africa- by Nick Longrich

 Duckbilled dinosaurs crossed oceans to reach Africa, fossil reveals

References

Cretaceous Morocco
Fossil taxa described in 2020
Late Cretaceous dinosaurs of Africa
Lambeosaurines
Maastrichtian genus first appearances
Maastrichtian genus extinctions
Ornithischian genera